Underground Work (Women) Convention, 1935 is  an International Labour Organization Convention.

It was established in 1935, with the preamble stating:
Having decided upon the adoption of certain proposals with regard to the employment of women on underground work in mines of all kinds,..

Ratifications
As of 2023, the treaty has been ratified by 98 states. Of the ratifying states, 30 have subsequently denounced the convention.

References

External links
Text.
Ratifications.

International Labour Organization conventions
Women's rights instruments
Treaties concluded in 1935
Treaties entered into force in 1937
Treaties of the Kingdom of Afghanistan
Treaties of Argentina
Treaties of Azerbaijan
Treaties of the Bahamas
Treaties of the People's Republic of Angola
Treaties of Bangladesh
Treaties of the Byelorussian Soviet Socialist Republic
Treaties of Bosnia and Herzegovina
Treaties of Bolivia
Treaties of Vargas-era Brazil
Treaties of the People's Republic of Bulgaria
Treaties of Cameroon
Treaties of the Republic of China (1912–1949)
Treaties of Costa Rica
Treaties of Cuba
Treaties of Croatia
Treaties of Cyprus
Treaties of Ivory Coast
Treaties of the Dominican Republic
Treaties of Ecuador
Treaties of the Kingdom of Egypt
Treaties of Fiji
Treaties of Gabon
Treaties of Ghana
Treaties of the Kingdom of Greece
Treaties of Guatemala
Treaties of Guinea
Treaties of Guinea-Bissau
Treaties of Guyana
Treaties of Haiti
Treaties of Honduras
Treaties of British India
Treaties of Indonesia
Treaties of Japan
Treaties of Kenya
Treaties of Kyrgyzstan
Treaties of Lebanon
Treaties of Lesotho
Treaties of Malawi
Treaties of the Federation of Malaya
Treaties of Mexico
Treaties of Montenegro
Treaties of Morocco
Treaties of Nicaragua
Treaties of Nigeria
Treaties of the Dominion of Pakistan
Treaties of Panama
Treaties of Papua New Guinea
Treaties of the Estado Novo (Portugal)
Treaties of the Soviet Union
Treaties of Saudi Arabia
Treaties of Serbia and Montenegro
Treaties of Sierra Leone
Treaties of Singapore
Treaties of the Solomon Islands
Treaties of the Somali Republic
Treaties of the Union of South Africa
Treaties of the Dominion of Ceylon
Treaties of Eswatini
Treaties of Switzerland
Treaties of the United Arab Republic
Treaties of Tajikistan
Treaties of Tanganyika
Treaties of North Macedonia
Treaties of Tunisia
Treaties of Turkey
Treaties of the Ukrainian Soviet Socialist Republic
Treaties of Uganda
Treaties of Venezuela
Treaties of Vietnam
Treaties of Yugoslavia
Mining treaties
Treaties extended to Aruba
Treaties extended to the Territory of Papua and New Guinea
Treaties extended to French Comoros
Treaties extended to French Somaliland
Treaties extended to French Guiana
Treaties extended to French Polynesia
Treaties extended to Guadeloupe
Treaties extended to Martinique
Treaties extended to New Caledonia
Treaties extended to Réunion
Treaties extended to Saint Pierre and Miquelon
Treaties extended to the Trust Territory of Somalia
Treaties extended to the British Leeward Islands
Treaties extended to the British Windward Islands
Treaties extended to British Dominica
Treaties extended to the Colony of the Bahamas
Treaties extended to British Honduras
Treaties extended to the Bechuanaland Protectorate
Treaties extended to British Cyprus
Treaties extended to the Colony of Fiji
Treaties extended to the Gold Coast (British colony)
Treaties extended to British Guiana
Treaties extended to British Hong Kong
Treaties extended to British Kenya
Treaties extended to Basutoland
Treaties extended to the Gilbert and Ellice Islands
Treaties extended to Nyasaland
Treaties extended to the Federation of Malaya
Treaties extended to the Colony and Protectorate of Nigeria
Treaties extended to the Aden Protectorate
Treaties extended to the Colony of Sierra Leone
Treaties extended to the Crown Colony of Singapore
Treaties extended to the British Solomon Islands
Treaties extended to Swaziland (protectorate)
Treaties extended to Tanganyika (territory)
Treaties extended to the Kingdom of Tonga (1900–1970)
Treaties extended to the Uganda Protectorate
Treaties extended to the New Hebrides
Treaties extended to Northern Rhodesia
Treaties extended to Southern Rhodesia
Treaties extended to British Cameroon
Treaties extended to British Togoland
1935 in labor relations
1935 in women's history